Forever Since Breakfast is the first release by American indie rock band Guided by Voices, released on vinyl in 1986.  In contrast to the lo-fi sound they would cultivate in the coming years, this EP was recorded in a professional studio, and features a nearly slick sound that anticipates their late 1990s major-label efforts. Robert Pollard, the band's driving force, has since derided the EP's sound as sterile. Like much of their early output, the songs featured bear a prominent college rock influence, particularly from R.E.M. The title reportedly comes from Charles Manson's response to an interviewer when asked to state his age.

The record was first released on CD as part of 2003's Hardcore UFOs box set, and was reissued on vinyl in 2005.

Track listing
 "Land of Danger"  – 3:09
 "Let's Ride"  – 3:26
 "Like I Do"  – 2:42
 "Sometimes I Cry"  – 3:03
 "She Wants to Know"  – 3:15
 "Fountain of Youth"  – 3:59
 "The Other Place"  – 3:34

Personnel

Guided by Voices 
 Robert Pollard – vocals, guitar
 Mitch Mitchell – bass guitar
 Paul Comstock – guitar
 Mitch Swan – guitar
 Peyton Eric – drums

Technical 

 Pete Jamison – photography
 Chuck Madden – mastering
 Robert Pollard – cover artwork
 Wayne Hartman – engineer

References

1986 EPs
Guided by Voices EPs